Tricholoma populinum is a mushroom of the agaric genus Tricholoma. It was formally described by Danish mycologist Jakob Emanuel Lange in 1933.

See also
List of North American Tricholoma
List of Tricholoma species

References

populinum
Fungi described in 1933
Fungi of Europe
Fungi of North America